Bon Kuyeh (also Romanized as Bon Kūyeh; also known as  Boneh-ye Kūyeh, Barkūh, Berkeh Khooni, and Borkūh) is a village in Abshur Rural District, Forg District, Darab County, Fars Province, Iran. At the 2006 census, its population was 88, in 16 families.

References 

Populated places in Darab County